Sasbach is a town in the district of Emmendingen in Baden-Württemberg in Germany. Sasbach is adjacent to the river Rhine and the Kaiserstuhl mountain range. It is the location of two medieval castle ruins, Limburg and Sponeck.

References

Emmendingen (district)